Natalia is a female given name with the original Late Latin meaning of "Christmas Day" (cf. Latin natale domini). It is currently used in this form in Italian, Romanian, Spanish, Portuguese, Greek, Russian, Ukrainian, Bulgarian and Polish. Other forms and spellings include Natalie/Nathalie (Dutch, English, French, German, Norwegian, Swedish, Danish, Finnish, and Icelandic), Natálie (Czech), Natália/Nathália (Portuguese, Slovak and Hungarian), Natalya/Nataliya, Nataliya/Natalya, Natallia,  (Latvian),  (Serbo-Croatian, Slovene, Lithuanian, and Macedonian), Natàlia (Catalan) and ნატალია (Georgian).

In Russian, a common diminutive is Natasha (Наташа).

Variants and derived forms of given name Natalia 

 Nathalie: English, French, Dutch, German, Slovak, Scandinavian languages, Romanian, Finnish, Luxembourgish, Hungarian, Corsican, Czech, Catalan, Malagasy, Slovenian, Spanish, Latin, Estonian
 Nathaly : Spanish, English 
 Nataly : English, Spanish 
 Natalyne : English 
 Nataline : English, French, Scandinavian languages, Catalan, Corsican, Italian, Hungarian, German, Dutch, Portuguese, Latin, Romanian, Estonian, Czech, Finnish, Slavic languages 
 Natalis : Latin

Notable people 
 Natalia (martyr) (died 852), martyr of Riobard and saint 
 Natalia (Belgian singer)
 Natalia (Spanish singer)
 Natalia Anciso, Chicana-Tejana contemporary artist and educator
 Natalia Avelon, Polish-German actress and singer
 Natalia Barbu, Moldovan singer
 Natalia Bardo (born 1988), Russian actress, singer and TV host
 Natalia Bessmertnova, Russian ballet dancer
 Natalia Chatzigiannidou, Greek footballer
 Natalia Damini, Singer
 Natalia Dyer, American actress
 Natalia Germanou, Greek lyricist, television hostess and DJ
 Natalia Getty, American model, artist, and activist 
 Natalia Gheorgiu (1914–2001), Moldovan and Soviet pediatric surgeon
 Natalia Gherman, Moldovan politician
 Natalia Ghilascu, Moldovan journalist
 Natalia Ginzburg, Italian novelist and writer
 Natalia Goncharova, Russian-French avant-garde painter and costume designer
 Natalia Gudina, Ukrainian-born Israeli figure skater
 Natalia Hadjiloizou, Cypriot swimmer
 Natalia Kills, English singer
 Natalia Komarova, Russian-American mathematician
Natalia Kuchinskaya, Soviet Olympic Champion Gymnast
 Natalia Kucirkova (born 1985), academic in the field of children's literature
 Natalia Kukulska, Polish singer
 Natalia Kusendova, Canadian politician
 Natalia Lafourcade, Mexican pop-rock singer and songwriter
 Natália Lage, Brazilian actress
 Natalia Lashchenova, Soviet Olympic champion gymnast
 Natalia Lesz, Polish singer
 Natalia Livingston, American actress
 Natalia Luis-Bassa, Venezuelan orchestral conductor
 Natalia Makarova, Russian Ballet dancer
 Nataliia Mandryk (born 1988), Ukrainian Paralympic wheelchair fencer
 Natalia Mashina (born 1997), Russian footballer
 Natália Milanová (born 1982), Slovakian politician
 Natalia Navarro, Miss Colombia 2009
 Natalia Negru, Romanian writer
 Natalia of Nicomedia (died 306), martyr and saint
 Natalia Oreiro, Uruguayan singer and actress
 Natalia Osipova, Russian ballet dancer
 Natalia Paruz, musical saw player
 Natália Pereira (born 1989), Brazilian volleyball player
 Natalia Pervaiz, Pakistani cricketer
 Natalia Podolskaya, 2005 Eurovision Song contestant for Russia
 Natalia Poklonskaya, public prosecutor of Crimea
 Natalia Polevshchikova, Russian supermodel known as Natasha Poly
 Natalia Roubina, Cypriot swimmer
 Natalia Rudina (known as Natali), Russian singer
 Natalia Sedova, second wife of the Marxist theorist Leon Trotsky
 Natalia Shelikhova, Russian fur trader 
 Natalia Sokol, Russian activist
 Natalia Tena, British actress
 Natalia Verbeke, Argentinian actress
 Natalia Vodianova, Russian model
 Natalia Yurchenko, Soviet All-Around World Champion Gymnast

Fictional characters
 Natalia, the protagonist of The Time of the Doves by Mercè Rodoreda
 Natalia Arlovskaya, the given name for the national personification of Belarus from the anime series Hetalia: Axis Powers
 Natalia Arron in the young adult novel Three Dark Crowns by Kendare Blake
 Natalia Boa Vista in CSI: Miami
 Natalia Dragomiroff in Agatha Christie's novel Murder on the Orient Express
 Natalia Kaminski in the light novel and anime Fate/Zero
 Natalia Kowalski, character in the video game Lego City Undercover
 Natalia Luzu Kimlasca Lanvaldear in the video game Tales of the Abyss
 Natalia Romanova in the Marvel universe, alias Natasha Romanoff and Black Widow
 Natalia "Natasha" Rostova in War and Peace
 Natalia Shulmenski in Laurie Halse Anderson's novel Prom
 Natalia Alexander in the Mexican teen drama Control Z
 Natalia "Talia", the fiancé of Mischa Bachinski from Ride the Cyclone

See also
 Natalee
 Nathalie
 Natalya
 Natasha
 Natacha

References

Latin feminine given names
Russian feminine given names
Italian feminine given names
Romanian feminine given names
Polish feminine given names
Spanish feminine given names
Portuguese feminine given names
Greek feminine given names
Belarusian feminine given names
Slavic feminine given names
Ukrainian feminine given names
Bulgarian feminine given names
Serbian feminine given names
Slovene feminine given names
Croatian feminine given names
Circassian feminine given names
Armenian feminine given names
Moldovan feminine given names